Motuara Island is a scenic and historical reserve that lies at the entrance to Tōtaranui / Queen Charlotte Sound. It is notable for the actions of James Cook. During 's stay at nearby Meretoto / Ship Cove, Cook climbed to the summit of Motuara, and formally (and controversially) claimed it and the adjacent lands in the name of and for the use of the sovereign of the British Empire.

Māori activity at the time of Cook's visits

Although the residents enjoyed long periods of peace, due to its strategic location over the years different tribal groups contested, fought and merged there; hence, the fortified  upon a partly attached rocky islet off the south east point of Motuara Island. Whenever trade opportunities or strife loomed, people gathered at the pā. Today this islet is called Hippah Island, after the early British use of the word "Hippah" for any fortified Māori site. The islets cliffs provided protection in times of skirmishes.

At the time HMS Endeavour sailed into the sound, Motuara's chief was an elderly man named Topaa. He and his people paddled waka out from the pā and encircled the ship. In terms of first contact, it was friendly and prolonged encounter, smoothed by Tupaia, the Tahitian priest and interpreter.

As Cook wrote in his journal:

During one of Topaa and Tupaia's conversations, Topaa said his ancestors came from Hawaiki. This is the same place that Tupaia came from.

Cook estimated the population in the Motuara, Ship Cove, Anahou area to number 300 to 400.  He wrote:

Cook's exploration and claim 
During Endeavours stay at nearby Meretoto / Ship Cove, James Cook and his crew explored and charted the sound, including Motuara Island. On 31 January 1770, Cook and his officers erected a flag post on the summit of the island, hoisted the Union Jack, and claimed Queen Charlotte Sound for his king.

Prior to the flag raising ceremony, Cook sought and gained permission from the Topaa and his people to put a mark on the island to prove that the British had been there. It is a matter of conjecture whether or not Cook overstepped his sealed orders from the British Admiralty, which read:

The way this act was commemorated on its 150th, 200th, and 250th anniversaries is an illustration of Cook's changing legacy in New Zealand.
On the 150th anniversary, a cairn was unveiled on the summit by the "Captain Cook Memorial Committee" to mark the occasion. The plaque on the cairn records that:

Fifty years after that, around the time of the 200th anniversary, working parties from various local clubs built a lookout tower. The platform grants panoramic views over the sound and out to Cook Strait.

Fifty years later, an interpretation panel put up as part of the 250th commemorations - presumably the Department of Conservation (New Zealand) and in consultation with local  (tribes) - tells the wider story, acknowledging all peoples "who have travelled to this special place".

After the flag raising ceremony, the party drank a toast to Queen Charlotte's health and gave the empty bottle to Topaa, who, in Cook's words, "was highly pleased". "You have to wonder though", poses the panel, "if Tapaa ever dreamed of what Cook’s actions would eventually mean for his people". Its goes on the say that Cook revisited the sound five times. He and other voyagers, such as Fabian von Bellingshausen, used Motuara as a lookout, observatory, signal station and garden.

Flora and fauna 
The once abundant native birds and bush-covered hills were much-admired by all. Cook's men planted vegetable gardens on Motuara; however, on his return, he noted in his journal:

Vegetables were resown by Tobias Furneaux on the HMS Adventure after the ship separated from Cook on the HMS Resolution. His garden thrived and provided much needed sustenance for the crew of returning ships. Overtime seeds from this garden was spread around New Zealand.

From the mid-1800s, the more vegetation was cleared by people from nearby Anahou to make way for gardens. By the early 1900s much of the remaining vegetation was eaten by quarantined angora goats and over time, by farmed sheep. All stock were removed in 1925, and the island was declared a scenic and historical reserve in 1976. Since rats were eradicated in 1991, the forest has regenerated itself, and today, the island is home to native birds, reptiles and insect, and a crèche for Okarito kiwi chicks. Being pest-free has meant that robin, saddleback, grey warbler, bellbird, tūī and fantail could be reintroduced.

See also

 Desert island
 List of islands

References 

Uninhabited islands of New Zealand
James Cook
Islands of the Marlborough Sounds
Protected areas of the Marlborough Region